Maria Vasilyevna Zhilova (1870–1934) was the first female Russian professional astronomer. She worked as astronomer and orbit calculator at the Pulkovo Observatory from 1895 to 1930.

In 1905 she was given an award by the Russian Astronomical Society for her work in celestial mechanics.

The asteroid 1255 Schilowa was named after her in 1932, at first spelled "Shilowa". The crater Zhilova on Venus was named after her in 1985.

She was one of the women discussed in a 2017 conference on "Women's Faces of Russian Science", where she was noted as  "one of the first professional woman astronomers".

Selected publications

References

1870 births
1934 deaths
Women astronomers
Russian astronomers